Helenin is a phytochemical mixture found in many plant species, including the Inula helenium (elecampane) of the family Asteraceae.  It is a mixture of two isomeric sesquiterpene lactones, alantolactone and isoalantolactone.

In 1895 the German scientists Julius Bredt and Wilhelm Posh extracted helenin from Inula helenium and determined its physical and chemical properties.

Natural sources
Alantolactone occurs in the roots of Inula helenium and other Inula species.

Properties 
Helenin can be extracted from the roots of Inula helenium using alcohol or other non-polar solvents to produce a mixture with a composition of about 40% alantolactone and 60% isoalantolactone.

Biological activity
Alantolactone has a variety of in vitro biochemical properties, including:
 induces apoptosis and cell cycle arrest in lung squamous cancer cells
 suppresses STAT3 activation
  has antiinflammatory effects by inhibiting chemokine production and STAT1 phosphorylation
 anti-fungal
 anti-microbial

Toxicity
Certain individuals have experienced contact dermatitis when exposed to alantolactone.

References 

Sesquiterpene lactones
Naphthofurans